Brian Thomas Littrell (born February 20, 1975) is an American singer and a member of the Backstreet Boys. He is also a contemporary Christian music artist, and released the solo album Welcome Home in 2006. He is the father of country singer Baylee Littrell.

In 2015, Littrell was inducted into the Kentucky Music Hall of Fame along with his cousin and bandmate Kevin Richardson.

Early life 
Littrell was born in Lexington, Kentucky, to Jacqueline "Jackie" R. (née Fox), a dentist's secretary, and Harold Baker Littrell, Jr, an IBM employee. He has an older brother Harold III, an actor and singer, and is the cousin of fellow Backstreet Boys member Kevin Richardson; his father, Harold, and Richardson's mother, Ann, are siblings.

Littrell was skilled at sports, and played in both Little League and the Babe Ruth League. Growing up in a religious Baptist family, he sang his first solo in Porter Memorial Baptist Church at age 7, and was voted President of the Youth Chorus by his peers one year. At 16, he began performing at weddings after Barry Turner, his choir teacher at Tates Creek High School, suggested he could make money singing at social events. Littrell also performed in school plays including a production of Grease, and worked at fast food chain Long John Silver's.

At 15, Littrell had aspirations to become a basketball player, but at  he struggled with his height, and was seldom selected for high school tournaments. He aspired to become a music minister, but in April 1993 during a history class at Tates Creek, Littrell's cousin and future bandmate Kevin Richardson called him out of an American History class and informed him of an audition for a fifth member of the Backstreet Boys. Littrell flew to Orlando the next day and finished high school via correspondence, graduating in 1994.

Career

Backstreet Boys 

In 1997, Littrell was instrumental in bringing a lawsuit against the group's creator Lou Pearlman, claiming Pearlman had concealed information regarding the group's earnings. Bandmates AJ McLean, Richardson and Howie Dorough joined the lawsuit which eventually resulted in a number of settlements, details of which were not disclosed. In 2000, he was among Teen People's 25 Hottest People Under 25, tying with Justin Timberlake of rival band *NSYNC.

Christian music 

Littrell longed to record Christian music, a genre he described as "pop positive". In 2004, Littrell signed a solo deal with Reunion Records and released the solo album Welcome Home in 2005. Littrell co-wrote six of the songs on the album, which sold over 100,000 copies in the US and reached No. 74 on the Billboard 200 charts. On the Christian album charts, Welcome Home debuted at No. 3. Four singles were released from the album – "In Christ Alone", "Wish", "Over My Head" and Welcome Home (You)", with the latter reaching No. 2 on the US Christian AC Charts. It was also No. 1 on Reach FM's Top 40 chart and on the US R&R Christian Inspirational charts for 3 weeks. In the summer of 2005, his solo single, "In Christ Alone", went to No. 1 on the Christian charts. Despite this change in his career, he remains a member of the Backstreet Boys.

Littrell won a Dove Award for Inspirational Recorded Song of the Year ("In Christ Alone") in 2006 along with songwriters Don Koch and Shawn Craig, and another in 2008 for "By His Wounds" with Glory Revealed. He also won Special Event Album of the Year in 2008 for Glory Revealed which was a compilation album with many other Christian artists; and in 2010, Special Event Album of the Year for Glory Revealed II.

Littrell released two Christmas collections featuring his wife Leighanne and son Baylee, Brian Littrell's Family Christmas, released on December 6, 2010, and Christmas with the Littrells, released on December 6, 2011.

TV and film appearances 
Littrell made appearances with the Backstreet Boys on Arthur, Sesame Street, and Sabrina the Teenage Witch, and he and bandmate McLean had cameos in Olive Juice, a film starring Littrell's wife Leighanne. Littrell also performed with The Backstreet Boys on Saturday Night Live, in 1998 and 1999. In 2013, Littrell made an appearance in the film This Is the End with his bandmates.

Other ventures 
During the band's hiatus, Littrell became committed to a number of other show business activities, most of them for charity. He has joined other celebrities in yearly NBA tours where he played basketball in every NBA city before a game, and has also played charity baseball games.

Personal life 

During the release of the band's 2015 documentary Backstreet Boys: Show 'Em What You're Made Of, Littrell shared some favorite moments of Kevin talking about Kevin's father, who died in August 1991 from colon cancer, and said how both the song and album had a special meaning to the title. During both the DNA Tour in Cincinnati, Ohio and the band's Las Vegas kick off on April 8, Littrell volunteered to sing his cousin's part of "Show Me the Meaning Of Being Lonely" when Kevin became emotional twice over the loss of his mother, who had died in January 2022.

Relationships
In June 1997, following the breakup of his relationship with girlfriend Samantha Stonebraker, Littrell met Leighanne Reena Wallace, an actress and model, on the "As Long as You Love Me" video set in which she was an extra. Littrell stated in J-14 magazine about this relationship that he had been out of the dating game for a while and meeting Leighanne opened a whole new chapter for him. "I had just gotten out of a relationship with a high school sweetheart that didn't work out. I didn't really have my eyes or mind set on anybody. It was something that just happened. If I was looking, I wouldn't have been able to find her." They dated for two years, and Littrell proposed on Christmas 1999;  their engagement, along with the engagement of cousin and bandmate Kevin Richardson to Kristin Willits, was announced on MTV on February 15, 2000. the couple got married in September 2000 at Peachtree Christian Church in Atlanta. On November 26, 2002, they had their son Baylee Thomas Wylee Littrell, who is now pursuing a similar path as his father's in the entertainment industry.

As of 2022, the family lives in Alpharetta, Georgia, near Atlanta, having been there since 2000 soon after Littrell and his wife got engaged.

Littrell stated during a show in Georgia on the DNA World Tour that his wife lost her mother from a heart condition in June 2022 and was a matriarch to him and the family.

Health issues 
Littrell was born with a congenital heart condition, making him susceptible to infections. He was diagnosed with a heart murmur at 6 weeks old. At 5 years old, he was hospitalized for two months due to a bacterial infection. Due to his hospitalization, Littrell was held back in school and had to repeat the first grade. In November 1997, doctors found his heart condition had caused his heart to enlarge considerably. Still, he underwent open-heart surgery on May 8, 1998 (which would be referenced by his scenes in the band's music video for "Show Me the Meaning of Being Lonely"). He later established the Brian Littrell Healthy Heart Club, a non-profit organization assisting children with heart conditions through medical, financial, and practical help.

In October 2009, Littrell became infected with swine flu, causing the cancellation of the Backstreet Boys This Is Us promotional tour.

In the 2015 documentary film, Littrell revealed his 2011 diagnosis of vocal tension dysphonia and dystonia. He continues to work with a therapist to help improve his condition.

Religious beliefs 
A devout Christian, Littrell has stated he believes it is the duty of Christians to be open about their faith, saying, "I think as Christians we need to join hands and mount up together and lift God up and talk about our faith publicly and talk about all of the things God has done for us in our life to touch other people." Littrell, who has been born again since the age of 8, has said that he attributes his success in life to God, and that his faith has always been "the utmost important thing" in his life.

Heritage
In 2019, a DNA heritage test revealed Littrell's ancestry to be 90.1% British Isles (20.7% English and 70.1% Irish/Scottish/Welsh), plus 7.1% Finnish and 2.1% Scandinavian.

Filmography

Discography

Albums

Singles

See also 
 Backstreet Boys
 List of Christian worship music artists

References

External links 
 
 
 

1975 births
Living people
20th-century American singers
21st-century American singers
Jive Records artists
American Christians
American male pop singers
American tenors
Backstreet Boys members
Baptists from Kentucky
American performers of Christian music
Musicians from Lexington, Kentucky
Musicians from Atlanta
People with congenital heart defects
Singers from Kentucky
Songwriters from Kentucky
Musicians with dystonia
NKOTBSB members